Układ Warszawski (Warsaw Pact) is a Polish television crime series that premiered on 4 September 2011 on TVN. The series directed by Łukasz Jaworski. It is broadcast every Sunday at 10:00 pm on channel TVN. The series finale aired on 27 November 2011.

On 27 October 2011, TVN cancelled Warsaw Pact after one season. The reason was too low ratings and little interest in the production.

Plot 
The series follows fortunes of Marek Oporny, a new policeman of the Criminal and Investigation Department in police station in Czerniaków. Before that, Marek have to get along with new colleagues „criminal old stagers”: Kosa, Sikorek and his commissioner partner Zuza Szarek.

Cast 
 Lesław Żurek as Marek Oporny
 Jan Englert as Antoni Rylski "Łapa", Marek's uncle
 Olga Bołądź as Zuzanna Szarek
 Katarzyna Gniewkowska as Elżbieta Oporna, Marek's mother
 Katarzyna Herman as Ewelina Bargan
 Grażyna Szapołowska as Róża Jackowska
 Adam Ferency as Artur Kosecki "Kosa"
 Bartłomiej Topa as Zbigniew Sikorek
 Alan Andersz as Wojciech Maciejewski "Młody"
 Jerzy Jeszke as "Wilk"

References

External links 
Official profile in Filmpolski.pl database

2011 Polish television series debuts
Polish crime television series
TVN (Polish TV channel) original programming